Joanna Pacuła (born 30 December 1957) is a Polish actress and model. Born in Tomaszów Lubelski and emigrating to the United States in the early 1980s, she first gained prominence through her modeling work for Vogue. Her breakthrough performance in the 1983 film Gorky Park earned her a Golden Globe nomination for Best Supporting Actress in a Motion Picture. In the years since, she established herself as a character actress, appearing in numerous high-profile films and television series.

Life and career 
Pacuła was born in Tomaszów Lubelski, Poland, to a pharmacist mother and an engineer father. She has a sister, Ewa Pacuła, a model and TV personality who has also worked in the United States.

In 1979, Pacuła graduated from the Aleksander Zelwerowicz State Theatre Academy. After graduation, she joined the Warsaw Dramatic Theatre, where she acted until 1981. She began her career playing in productions of Shakespeare's Romeo and Juliet, Othello, and As You Like It. She also found work in a few films, including Krzysztof Zanussi's Camouflage (Barwy ochronne, 1977) and Sergiu Nicolaescu's Last Night of Love (Ultima noapte de dragoste, 1980) in Romania.

In 1981, Pacuła was in Paris when the communist authorities in Poland declared martial law. She did not return to her homeland, and in 1982 emigrated to the United States, where she specialized in playing European temptresses. Her feature debut came in appearing opposite William Hurt in Gorky Park (1983). She was praised by Roman Polanski for that role. She played in numerous American TV series and movies, including The Holocaust drama Escape From Sobibor (CBS, 1987),   The Kiss (1988), E.A.R.T.H. Force (CBS, 1990), and the TV series, The Colony (ABC, 1996). She also starred in Lewis Gilbert's Not Quite Jerusalem released in 1984.

She was featured in Marked for Death (1990) as an expert on Jamaican voodoo and gangs; in the Italian erotic thriller Husband and Lovers (1992) as a free-spirited adultress; Tombstone (1993) as Doc Holliday's lover, Kate (also known as Big Nose Kate and Mary Catherine Horoney, born 7 November 1850); in The Haunted Sea (1997); and in the film Virus (1999), playing a Russian scientist. She currently resides in Southern California.

Milestones 
 Pacula was chosen by People  as one of its 50 Most Beautiful People in the world (1990).
 She was listed as one of 12 "Promising New Actors of 1984" in John Willis' Screen World, volume 36.

Filmography 
Film
 Ultima noapte de dragoste (1980) - Leah Gheorghiu
 Czułe miejsca (1981) - Nurse
 Gorky Park (1983) - Irina Asanova
 Not Quite Paradise (1985) - Gila
 Escape from Sobibor (1987) - Luka
 Death Before Dishonor (1987) - Elli Gellar 
 The Kiss (1988) - Felice
 Sweet Lies (1988) - Joelle
 Options (1989) - Princess Nicole
 Breaking Point (1989) - Anna/Diana
 Marked for Death (1990) - Professor Leslie
 Husband and Lovers (1991) - Alina
 Eyes of the Beholder (1992) - Diana Carlyle
 Body Puzzle (1992) - Tracy Marella
 Black Ice (1992) - Vanessa
 Warlock: The Armageddon (1993) - Paula Dare
 Under Investigation (1993) - Abbey Jane Strong
 Tombstone (1993) - Kate Elder
 Private Lessons II (1993) - Sophie Morgan
 The Silence of the Hams (1994) - Lily Wine
 Every Breath (1994) - Lauren
 Not Like Us (1995) - Anita Clark
 Timemaster (1995) - Evelyn Adams
 Last Gasp (1995) - Nora Weeks
 Captain Nuke and the Bomberboys (1995) - Brenda Franelli
 The Haunted Sea (1997) - Bergen
 Heaven Before I Die (1997) - Selma
 In Praise of Older Women (1997) - Marta
 The White Raven (1998) - Julie Konnenman
 My Giant (1998) - Lilliana Rotaru
 The Art of Murder (1999) - Elizabeth Sheridan
 Virus (1999) - Nadia
 Error in Judgement (1999) - Liz 
 Crash and Byrnes (2000) - Lissette
 The Hit (2001) - Sonia
 Crusade of Vengeance (2002) - Elizabeth
 No Place Like Home (2002) - Gretchen Klein
 Cupid's Prey (2003) - Iris Wharton
 El Padrino (2004) - Jessica Lancaster
 Moscow Heat (2004) - Sasha
 Dead Easy (2004) - Teresa Storm
 The Cutter (2005) - Elizabeth Teller
 Honor (2006) - Rose Tyrell
 Forget About It - Talia Nitti
 When Nietzsche Wept (2007) - Mathilda
 Shannon's Rainbow (2009) - Emily Blair
 Black Widow (2010) - Olivia
 ICE Agent (2013) - Sheila Hayman
 Break Even (2020) - Agent Crowe

Television
 Deep Red (1994, television film) - Monica Quik 
 Business for Pleasure (1997, television film) - Anna
 Sweet Deception (1998, television film) - Risa Gallagher
 Dead Man's Gun (1999, 1 episode) - Yvotte Ballinger
 Brutally Normal (2000, 7 episodes) - Gogi
 Night Visions (2001, 1 episode) - Head Immigrant
 Robbery Homicide Division (2002, 1 episode) - Trisha Sandifer
 Lightning Bolts of Destruction (2003, television film) - Dr. Valery Landis
 Dinocroc (2004, television film)
 Jake in Progress (2005, 1 episode) - Elsa Winters
 Monk (2008, 1 episode) - Leyla Zlatavich
 Stolen Child (2012, television film) - Tatiana
 Bones (2014, 1 episode) - Drina Mirga

Awards and nominations

References

External links 
 

1957 births
Living people
Aleksander Zelwerowicz National Academy of Dramatic Art in Warsaw alumni
People from Tomaszów Lubelski
People from Tomaszów Lubelski County
Polish emigrants to the United States
Polish film actresses
Polish stage actresses
Polish television actresses
20th-century Polish actresses
21st-century Polish actresses